Lee Ji-hun (born 14 November 1995) is a South Korean modern pentathlete. He won the silver medal in the men's event at the 2018 Asian Games held in Jakarta, Indonesia.

He earned a spot for a competitor to represent South Korea at the 2020 Summer Olympics in Tokyo, Japan after winning the gold medal in the men's individual event at the 2019 Asia/Oceania Championships & Olympic Qualifier. Jung Jin-hwa competed at the 2020 Summer Olympics in the men's modern penthathlon.

References

External links 
 

Living people
1995 births
Place of birth missing (living people)
South Korean male modern pentathletes
Asian Games medalists in modern pentathlon
Modern pentathletes at the 2018 Asian Games
Asian Games silver medalists for South Korea
Medalists at the 2018 Asian Games
20th-century South Korean people
21st-century South Korean people